The Chinese shrew or dusky shrew (Sorex sinalis) is a species of mammal in the family Soricidae. It is endemic to China, where it occurs in Gansu, Sichuan (including Jiuzhaigou), and Shaanxi. Its natural habitat is subtropical or tropical dry forest.

Sources

Mammals of China
Sorex
Taxonomy articles created by Polbot
Mammals described in 1912
Taxa named by Oldfield Thomas